Eorotex was a Swiss professional cycling team that existed from 1982 to 1983. It participated in the 1982 Tour de France, winning one stage (Stefan Mutter).

References

Cycling teams based in Switzerland
Defunct cycling teams based in Switzerland
1982 establishments in Switzerland
1983 disestablishments in Switzerland
Cycling teams established in 1982
Cycling teams disestablished in 1983